Keriq (also Romanized as Kerīq) is a village in Hir Rural District, of Hir District, Ardabil County, Ardabil province, Iran. At the 2006 census, its population was 1,756 in 310 households. The following census in 2011 counted 1,528 people in 397 households. The latest census in 2016 showed a population of 1,278 people in 356 households; it is the largest village in its rural district.

References 

Ardabil County

Towns and villages in Ardabil County

Populated places in Ardabil Province

Populated places in Ardabil County